Alyssa Mendonsa (born ) is an Indian playback singer who made her debut in the film Karthik Calling Karthik with the song "Uff Teri Adaa".

Early life
Alyssa Mendonsa is the daughter of composer Loy Mendonsa of the Shankar–Ehsaan–Loy trio who compose music for Bollywood films. She also sang "Oh Girl" and "Papa Jag Jayega" along with Neeraj Shridhar and Ritu Pathak for the Sajid Khan movie Housefull. Her vocal for the song "Adhoore" of Break Ke Baad was well received by the audiences. She also sang "Baby When You Talk To Me" for the film Patiala House. Her recent song was "Khushfehmiyan" for the film One by Two (2014) with Shankar Mahadevan.

Career
Mendonsa song "Khaabon Ke Parinday" from the movie Zindagi Na Milegi Dobara took the airwaves by storm. The melodious, soft acoustic guitars, harmonicas and stiff jazz style drums make this an endearing song / beat to listen to. Filmed on Katrina Kaif, this song has seen unsurpassed demand on airwaves. She has rendered a song in the 2013 Malayalam film Amen. She recently sang a song "Be You" for a Gurgaon based fashion and lifestyle e-commerce portal Jabong.com. The song is being featured on several TV channels in India.

She has written and produced her original composition 'You Were There For Me', which was quite popular.

Filmography

Awards and achievements 

 Won GIMA award. 
 Nominated for Filmfare award.

References

External links
 
 Alyssa Mendonsa Filmography: Bollywood Hungama
 Bollywood's popular Christian singers Rediff – 28 July 2011

Living people
Indian women playback singers
Indian women pop singers
21st-century Indian singers
Bollywood playback singers
Malayalam playback singers
1990s births
21st-century Indian women singers
Singers from Delhi
Women musicians from Delhi